Occupation: Dreamland is a "grunt's-eye view," 2005 documentary film focused on a company of the 1/505 of the 82nd Airborne Division in Fallujah, Iraq, in early 2004.  It is directed by Ian Olds and Garrett Scott.

The title comes from the nickname of the base, Camp Volturno, on the outskirts of Fallujah. The American soldiers housed there called the place "Camp Dreamland."  The film includes interviews with US soldiers, footage of their patrols in Fallujah, as well as interviews with Iraqi civilians.

Garrett Scott died of a heart attack at age 37 in 2005, days before Occupation won the Independent Spirit Award. Ian Olds has written and directed several short fiction films and a documentary about journalists in Afghanistan.

Synopsis
In January, 2004, in Al-Falluja, Iraq, a documentary film crew follows an infantry squad of the 82nd Airborne Division, US Army. Cameras accompany the squad of seven on day and night patrols, as they watch their backs, kick down doors, search for weapons, interrogate women, detain a few people, and listen to the complaints of locals. At their barracks, a former Baathist retreat called Dreamland, the men talk: about why they enlisted, civilian prospects, feelings about the war and Iraqis, where they were when a comrade died a few weeks before.

References

External links
 
 
 ''Occupation: Dreamland at Working Films

2005 films
American documentary films
Documentary films about the Iraq War
2005 documentary films
2000s English-language films
2000s American films